The Fleet and Industrial Supply Center, Oakland was a supply facility operated by the U.S. Navy in Oakland, California. During World War II, it was a major source of supplies and war materials for ships operating in the Pacific.

The Depot had its origin in 1940 when the Navy bought  of wetlands from the city of Oakland for $1.00. The Navy reclaimed the land and populated it with large warehouses. It opened on December 15, 1941, and quickly began a decades-long expansion. In the late 1940s it was renamed Naval Supply Center, Oakland; later it was renamed Fleet and Industrial Supply Center, Oakland. During the Cold War, it was one of the Navy's most important supply facilities.

The 1995 Base Realignment and Closure Commission recommended that the Center be closed.  It was closed in 1998, and in 1999, the Navy transferred the entire  property to the Port of Oakland. The new owner plans to develop it for intermodal freight transport involving a marine terminal, railroad, and truck cargo activities. The site is environmentally contaminated due to past activities.

A portion of the supply depot was developed into Middle Harbor Shoreline Park in 2003. Buildings were removed and environmental restoration created new wetlands for wildlife.

References

External links

Closed installations of the United States Navy
History of Oakland, California
Military facilities in the San Francisco Bay Area
California in World War II
Formerly Used Defense Sites in California
Military history of the United States during World War II
San Francisco Bay
1941 establishments in California
1998 disestablishments in California